The Technical Standards and Safety Authority (TSSA) is a regulatory authority that administers and enforces technical standards in the province of Ontario in Canada.

It is a nonprofit organization that has been given powers by the Government of Ontario to create and enforce public safety rules in such areas as elevators, ski lifts, amusement rides, fuels, boilers, pressure vessels and operating engineers in order to protect lives and the environment.

See also
Alberta Boilers Safety Association
Canadian Standards Association
Technical Safety Authority of Saskatchewan

References

External links
TSSA homepage

Organizations based in Toronto
Standards organizations in Canada